Tobias Fornier, officially the Municipality of Tobias Fornier, , is a 4th class municipality in the province of Antique, Philippines. According to the 2020 census, it has a population of 33,816 people, making it the ninth most populous municipality in the province of Antique.

History
The municipality was formerly known as Dao until 1978 when it was given its current name. It is named after a Congressman from Antique, Tobias Abiera Fornier (1902–October 31, 1964).

In 1957, a barrio named Barasanan was renamed to Ballescas. In the same year, barrio Taguimtim was renamed to Pacienca.

Geography

According to the Philippine Statistics Authority, the municipality has a land area of  constituting  of the  total area of Antique.

Climate

Barangays
Tobias Fornier is politically subdivided into 50 barangays.

Demographics

In the 2020 census, Tobias Fornier had a population of 33,816.

Economy

See also
 List of renamed cities and municipalities in the Philippines

References

External links
 [ Philippine Standard Geographic Code]

Municipalities of Antique (province)